Anna Santisteban (November 3, 1914 – May 18, 2003) was a Puerto Rican businesswoman and beauty entrepreneur who presided the Miss Puerto Rico beauty pageant.  This beauty contest was in charge of selecting the Puerto Rican delegate to compete for the title of Miss Universe, though other of its participants represented the Caribbean island in many other beauty competitions as well.

Career
Born in Guayama, Puerto Rico Santisteban thought to create a modeling agency. Santisteban's finishing school and modeling academy, Polianna, quickly became a landmark for all aspiring models in the island during the 1960s. She was famous for referring to her students as "my girls", her personal approach to training making her a mother figure for many runway and TV models at that time.

After the success of her first beauty enterprise, in 1962 Santisteban received an offer to produce the Miss Puerto Rico competition, a duty she took with serious intention. Her commitment paid off in 1970, when Marisol Malaret, a 20-year-old executive secretary, became the very first Puerto Rican to hold the coveted title of Miss Universe.

Malaret's triumph injected Santisteban with enthusiasm, especially when Idalia (Beba) Franco arrived as third runner-up in the 1971 international competition. One year later, in 1972, Puerto Rico became the first territory to host both the Miss USA and the Miss Universe pageants. These events meant the beginning of a new era for both Santisteban and her second husband, graphic designer Edward (Eddie) Ortiz.  They founded and established the Miss Puerto Rico Organization, which produced the annual competition that promptly became one of the most commented television events in the island.

Under Santisteban's close supervision, many Miss Puerto Rico titleholders became TV personalities, international models and business leaders.  Some of her detractors have said that Santisteban was a very strict trainer and a very ambitious woman. She neither confirmed nor denied this fact, always focused on her duties with superb elegance and great passion to win another international crown. Santisteban's eagerness had to wait until 1985, when Deborah Carthy-Deu won the second Miss Universe title for her country. After that second triumph, Puerto Rico scored remarkable positions in both the semifinal and final rounds of this competition.

In 1993, Dayanara Torres became Santisteban's third and last winner for the Miss Universe Pageant. Two years later, at the age of 81, Santisteban was the oldest national director for the organization but was inexplicably removed from her duties, a bold move that many people interpreted as age-discriminatory.

With first husband Luis Pedreira, Santisteban had three sons, Walter, Luis and Alberto, the youngest, who died in an accident. When Ortiz, her second husband and business partner, died in 2000, she suffered a fall and was removed from her Art-Deco home in the upmarket San Juan area known as Ocean Park, to a long-term care nursing home named Hogar Santa Teresa de Jornet.

Death
On May 18, 2003, Santisteban died at the Pavía Hospital in Santurce, Puerto Rico after battling a long illness.

References

1914 births
2003 deaths
20th-century Puerto Rican businesspeople
People from Guayama, Puerto Rico
Puerto Rican women in business
20th-century American women